GDOR may refer to:
 Georgia Department of Revenue, a revenue agency
 Glutathione dehydrogenase (ascorbate), an enzyme